DISJ may refer to:
German International School Jeddah (Deutsche Internationale Schule Jeddah)
Deutsche Internationale Schule Johannesburg